F4 British Championship (full name ROKiT F4 British Championship certified by FIA, formerly known as F4 British Championship certified by FIA — powered by Ford (2016–21), MSA Formula (2015)) is a single-seater motorsport series based in the United Kingdom. The series is run to the FIA's Formula 4 regulations, and is administered by Motorsport UK. The championship is designed as a low-cost entrance to car racing, and is aimed at young racing drivers moving up from karting.

The championship replaces the British Formula Ford Championship, and used a chassis produced by Mygale and engines from Ford for seven seasons from 2015 to 2021. With Motorsport UK taking over the organization of the championship for years 2022–24, as Ford concluded their involvement, the championship will switch to a Tatuus chassis and Abarth as the engines supplier.

The series is part of the TOCA tour, a series of events run alongside the British Touring Car Championship.

Championship format 
Each championship event consists of three races. The series is run in support of the BTCC.

Fifteen-year-olds are eligible to compete in the series, after the MSA lowered the age limit for single-seater championships. The winner of the championship will be named the FIA Formula 4 champion, and will be rewarded a test with a top-level regional Formula Three team.

The car

2015–2021 
Mygale M14-F4 provided a carbon-fibre monocoque chassis. The engine was a Ford 1.6L EcoBoost engine as used in the more modern Formula Ford cars, tuned to a maximum of 160 PS. All engines were prepared and tuned by Neil Brown Engineering, to lower costs and ensure engine equalisation. Hankook was the sole tyre supplier, with the cars running on the same compound and construction rubber as used in Formula Three. Sadev provided the sequential paddle shift transmission. The engine control unit was an F88GDI4 from Life Racing which featured integrated paddle shift control, GPS track mapping and also functions as the complete data acquisition system.

The total price of purchasing the car is capped at £36,000.

2022–present 
Starting from the 2022 season, teams have started using the combination of Tatuus F4-T-421 chassis and the engines supplied by Abarth.

Champions

Drivers

Teams'

Rookie class

Nations Cup

Ford F4 Challenge Cup

Circuits 

 Bold denotes a circuit will be used in the 2023 season.

Notes

References

External links 

 
Auto racing series in the United Kingdom
One-make series